Gaidher / Gaidhar also known as Gajdhar is a word of Gujarati, Kutchi and Rajasthani language. The word Gaidher derives its origin from the word Gadh or  Garh.  The word Gadh in north Indian languages like Hindi, Gujarati, Rajasthani, Marwari, Marathi means a fort, like Chittorgarh, Sinhgadh, Mehrangadh.

The persons who were expert and had skilled knowledge to plan and build a fort were called Gaidher or Gajdhar. Gaidhar means chief architect. Gaidhar literally also means a construction foreman or a Master Mason. Forts were built at strategic locations, often on a hill-top, to guard the kingdoms.

Gaidhar held an important place in king's court and were looked upon with respect. Gaidhar were appointed by kings, upon their skills and also loyalty. Gaidhar were persons of high integrity as they used to make the blue-print of fort and whole forts were erected under his supervision and guidance. The kings used to trust them and they had the power and authority to hire manual laborers and skilled masons for such construction works.

For example, members from Mestri and Suthar communities, who were master-builders, were usually appointed as Gaidher in Cutch.
In Madhya Pradesh, Gajdhar was a title awarded to the city architects and held an important place in the royal court and were looked upon with respect.
Sometimes upon requirement another, two or three Gaidhers were then appointed with his consultation by king and they used to work under head Gaidher as their assistants, Something like Assistant Engineer.

Surname

This is also one of the occupational surnames found in persons of India or Indian origin.

In India or persons of Indian origin you can find many people using Gaidhar or Gajdhar as a surname. The persons using this surname are usually found in people of Rajasthan, Madhya Pradesh and Gujarat.

References

Indian architectural history
Surnames
Indian words and phrases
Indian surnames